The olive honeyeater (Lichmera argentauris) is a species of bird in the family Meliphagidae.
It is endemic to Indonesia, where it inhabits the Maluku Islands.

References

olive honeyeater
Birds of the Maluku Islands
olive honeyeater
Taxonomy articles created by Polbot